Bartosz Paluchowski (born 20 June 1989 in Oświęcim) is a Polish former competitive pair skater. With Aneta Michałek, he placed 13th at the 2006 World Junior Championships in Ljubljana, Slovenia. The pair was coached by Iwona Mydlarz-Chruścińska in Oświęcim.

Paluchowski also competed in partnership with Agnieszka Klimek, Katarzyna Wilczyk, and Małgorzata Lipińska. He coaches figure skating in Warsaw. He is an ISU technical specialist.

Programs 
(with Michałek)

Competitive highlights
JGP: ISU Junior Grand Prix

Pairs with Lipińska

Pairs with Wilczyk

Pairs with Michałek

Pairs with Klimek

Men's singles

References

External links
 
 

1989 births
Figure skating officials
Polish male pair skaters
People from Oświęcim
Living people
Sportspeople from Lesser Poland Voivodeship